Hoet is a surname. Notable people with the surname include: 

Gerard Hoet (1648–1733), Dutch Golden Age painter and engraver
Griet Hoet (born 1978), Belgian para-cyclist
Jan Hoet (1936–2014), Belgian founder of SMAK

Chemistry
Ethanol, a simple alcohol sometimes abbreviated as HOEt

See also
Voet